Jangy McKinley Addy (born 2 March 1985) is a Liberian decathlete.

He was born in 1985 in Sacramento, California, was raised in Norcross, Georgia and attended the University of Tennessee. His parents are from Liberia and he was eligible to compete for that nation. He served as the flag-bearer for Liberia at the 2008 Summer Olympics, where he finished 19th in the decathlon.

Achievements

References

External links

 
 Sports Reference - Olympic Sports for Jangy Addy

1985 births
Living people
Liberian male decathletes
American people of Liberian descent
Athletes (track and field) at the 2008 Summer Olympics
Athletes (track and field) at the 2012 Summer Olympics
Olympic athletes of Liberia
People from Norcross, Georgia
University of Tennessee alumni
American male decathletes
Track and field athletes from Sacramento, California
African Games gold medalists for Liberia
African Games medalists in athletics (track and field)
Athletes (track and field) at the 2011 All-Africa Games
Sportspeople from the Atlanta metropolitan area